Rakaswadi is a village in India, situated in the Mawal taluka of Pune district in the state of Maharashtra.

Administration
The village is administrated by a sarpanch, an elected representative who leads a gram panchayat. At the time of the 2011 Census of India, the gram panchayat governed five villages and was based at Shirdhe.

Demographics
At the 2011 census, the village comprised 2 households. The population of 20 was split between 10 males and 10 females.

See also
List of villages in Mawal taluka

References

Villages in Mawal taluka